I Am No One You Know: Stories is a short story collection by Joyce Carol Oates. It was published in 2004 by Ecco Press, an imprint of HarperCollins Publishers. There are 19 stories in this collection.

Contents
The stories include (in the order they appear in the book):

Part One
 Curly Red: A girl nicknamed "Curly Red" reveals a secret in her family that concerns a racist crime.
 In Hiding: A poet responds to a black man's letters of his own works.
 I'm Not Your Son, I Am No One You Know: A man and his brother visits their demented father in a nursing home. 
 Aiding and Abetting
 Fugitive
 Me & Wolfie: A boy and his young mother travels around and the boy tells of their lives.
 The Girl with the Blackened Eye: A 15-year-old girl is forcibly abducted and held hostage for several days in the hands of a serial rapist and killer.

Part Two
 Cumberland Breakdown: After a fire kills their father and their mother becomes reclusive, a girl and her brother go and find the house of the family who started the fire.
 Upholstery: A woman, travelling back to her hometown after she became an adult, reminisces on how she, as a girl, was attracted to an adult man who works in an upholstery shop, had a frightful evening that almost resulted in horrible havoc.
 Wolf's Head Lake
 Happiness
 Fire: A woman and her brother visits a neighborhood after their doctor father was killed in a fire in his house.
 The Instructor: A woman, who takes up an evening teaching position in a college, encounters someone unusual.

Part Three
 The Skull: A Love Story
 The Deaths: An Elegy: After being separated for many years after their parents' deaths, a woman and her brother meet again and visit the site where their father allegedly hacked their mother to death. The end of the story hints one might kill the other, how history might just repeats itself.
 Jorie (& Jamie): A Desposition: In a dysfunctional family, a girl tells the story of how her manipulative twin who slyly hurts her and her brother.
 Mrs. Halifax and Rickie Swann: A Ballad: When a teacher sees a boy in her high school class, they begin an adulterous relationship.

Part Four
 Three Girls: Two girls, after seeing Marilyn Monroe shopping for books in a second-hand bookshop, decide to protect her by not revealing her presence.
 The Mutants: Although it is not directly said in the story, it is presumed that the story is about the 9/11 attacks. A young woman, after experiencing the attack from faraway, ran up to her apartment, and became something else, stronger.

Acknowledgments

Critical Reception
 "The Girl with the Blackened Eye" was selected for The Best American Mystery Stories 2001.
 "The Skull" was selected for Best American Mystery Stories, 2003.
 "Three Girls" was a National Magazine Awards 2003 finalist and also won The Pushcart Prize, XXVIII.
 "Curly Red" was a National Magazine Awards 2002 finalist.
 "The Instructor" won The Pushcart Prize, XXVII.
 "The Girl with the Blackened Eye" won Prize Stories: The O Henry Awards, 2001.

Jane Smiley of New York Times Book Review said of Oates (on the back of the book cover of first edition 2004):
With her prodigious gifts of invention and her systematic explorations of literary history, she has gone beyond the demands of the marketplace....Like J.S. Bach, Joyce Carol Oates often seems to be working in private, cultivating the variety and complexity of her vision in service to something larger than a literary career."

John Schwartz of New York Times Book Review (on the front cover of first Ecco paperback edition 2005):
These are small, hard gems, full of the same rich emotion and startling observation that readers of Oates' fiction have come to expect.

Publishers Weekly: "In Oates's precise psychological renderings, victims are as complex as villains and almost always more interesting....[E]ven the strangest events in this sure-footed collection are painfully familiar." 

Booklist: "Her new searing short stories explore the malevolent aspects of human sexuality with unflinching authenticity and a cathartic fascination." 

Kirkus Reviews: "More of the same, from the most frustratingly uneven writer in the business....[T]he usual disjointed gathering of carefully composed and inexplicably slipshod work....Vintage Oates — and very much an acquired taste."

Library Journal: "Oates demonstrates her continued ability to create edgy stories that are still grounded in reality. She immerses the reader in disturbing dilemmas and then resolves them in unexpected ways."

2004 short story collections
Short story collections by Joyce Carol Oates
Ecco Press books